The Jurchen unification were a series of events in the late 16th and early 17th centuries that led to the unification of the Jurchen tribes under Nurhaci, a Jianzhou Jurchen leader who had an antagonistic relationship with the Ming dynasty due to their involvement in events early on in his life that led to the death of his father and grandfather. From 1583 to the early 1600s, Nurhaci led a series of military and influence campaigns that led to the unification of the majority of the Jurchen tribes. In 1616, Nurhaci established the Later Jin dynasty and ruled as its founding khan.

Background
The Ming dynasty categorized the Jurchens into three groups, the Jianzhou Jurchens, the Haixi Jurchens, and the Wild Jurchens. The Jianzhou were primarily composed of three tribes, the Odoli, Huligai, and Tuowen. The Haixi were dominated by the Hulun confederation composed of four tribes, the Ula, Hada, Hoifa, and Yehe. Not much is known about the Wild Jurchens except for the existence of a Donghai tribe among them.

The Hulun confederation was dominated by the head of the Hada tribe, Wang Tai, from 1548 onward. As hegemon he created alliances with both Jurchens and Mongols, eventually assuming the title of khan. Under Wang Tai, the Hulun expanded their territory at the expense of the Jianzhou. However his rule was based on personal prestige, and when he died in 1582, his son lost control of the confederation. Power over the Hulun passed from the Hada to two brothers of the Yehe tribe. At this point the Ming intervened and decided to open separate markets to divide and weaken their authority over the Hulun. This inadvertently led to the rise of the Jianzhou Jurchens.

Jianzhou war
The Jianzhou chieftain Wang Gao (王杲) had been hostile to the Ming for some time and frequently assaulted Ming cities with Mongol allies. After he killed the Ming commander at Fushun in 1573, the Ming counter-attacked and drove Wang north into the lands of the Hada, where he was captured by Wang Tai, leader of the Hulun alliance, who handed him over to Li Chengliang. Li had him executed in 1575.

The death of Wang Gao provoked a power struggle among the Jianzhou tribes. Previously subordinates of Wang Gao, Giocangga and his son Taksi secretly allied themselves with Li Chengliang to enhance their power. In 1582 Wang Gao's son Atai (阿台) raided Ming lands. Ming sent a punitive expedition with the support of Giocangga and Taksi. During the assault on Atai's fort, both Giocangga and Taksi were killed by another Jurchen ally of the Ming, Nikan Wailan. The Ming claimed it was an accident and refused to hand over Nikan Wailan over to Taksi's son, Nurhaci, although they did provide him with some gifts and investiture as reparation.

Rise of Nurhaci

Nurhaci grew to be a promising leader. He was talented in mounted archery as a youth and was proficient in the Jurchen, Mongol, and Chinese languages.

Early in 1583, Nurhaci obtained from Li Chengliang the right to succeed his father as a minor Jurchen chieftain. He went to war with Nikan Wailan and forced him to flee to the Ming dynasty, where he was eventually executed. Nurhaci continued to expand his influence by steadily wiping out smaller tribes while at the same time currying favor with the Ming. He personally led tributary missions to the Ming court until 1606, returned Ming captives back to the proper authorities, and even offered to fight against the Japanese invasions of Korea (1592–1598), although he was denied the opportunity due to misgivings from the Koreans.

In 1587, Nurhaci founded a new capital at Fe Ala. By 1591, he controlled a swathe of territory stretching from Fushun to the Yalu River. His success provoked a combined assault by nine tribes composed of  Hada, Ula, Hoifa, Khorchin Mongols, Sibe, Guwalca, Jušeri, Neyen, and the Yehe. The 30,000 strong coalition forces were defeated in 1593.

As of 1599, Nurhaci had control over the Hada, but allowed the Ming to invest their leaders with titles. Nurhaci also worked to unify the Jurchens as a people by tasking Erdeni Baksi and Dahai Jargūci with adapting the Mongol script to the Jurchen language. He also created the Eight Banners army system that would characterize Manchu military organization for the majority of their history. In 1601 he dispensed with pretenses and subjugated the Hada. The Hoifa followed in 1607 and a campaign against the Ula was begun in 1608.

In 1603 the Jianzhou capital was moved to Hetu Ala due to water problems at the previous site. In 1605, Gwanghaegun of Joseon sent an expedition north which destroyed the Jurchen Holjaon tribe. The majority of Jurchens however ended up as part of Nurhaci's realm. The Wild Jurchens were defeated in 1611 and the Ula were incorporated in 1613.

The last major Jurchen tribe, the Yehe, would not be subjugated until 1619, three years after Nurhaci declared himself khan of the Later Jin dynasty, also known as the Amaga Aisin Gurun. The Yehe joined the Ming in fighting Nurhaci at the Battle of Sarhū, but they were defeated, and finally subjugated at the Battle of Xicheng a few months later.

References

Bibliography
 .

 (alk. paper)

 

  (paperback).
 
 

 
 .

 

 
 
 

 
 

 

 
  
 

 
 

Jurchen history
16th century in China
17th century in China
Nurhaci